The Society for Affective Science is a non-profit organization dedicated to fostering basic and applied research on affect. It was founded in 2013 by Lisa Feldman Barrett and James Gross.

References

Affective science
Neuroscience organizations
Psychology organizations based in the United States
Psychology-related professional associations
Scientific organizations established in 2013